PTT was the Swiss Postal Telegraph and Telephone agency, formed in 1928.

In the course of the international trend towards liberalisation of the telecommunications market, it was transformed into two public service companies on January 1, 1998, Swiss Post and Swisscom. While Swiss Post remained a government agency with a partial service monopoly, Swisscom became a competitor on a liberalised telecommunications market and is an Aktiengesellschaft of which the Confederation holds a majority of shares.

The historical documents concerning the organization and the management of the Directorate General of Posts, the District Postal Services as well as the individual post offices are accessible at the PTT Archive.

References 

Telecommunications companies of Switzerland
Defunct companies of Switzerland
Switzerland
Government agencies established in 1928
1928 establishments in Switzerland
Organizations disestablished in 1998